Fromager Region is a defunct region of Ivory Coast. From 2000 to 2011, it was a first-level subdivision region. The region's capital was Gagnoa and its area was 6,903 km2. Since 2011, the area formerly encompassed by the region is the second-level Gôh Region in Gôh-Djiboua District.

Creation
Fromager Region was created in 2000 by combining Gagnoa Department from Haut-Sassandra Region and Oumé Department from Marahoué Region.

Administrative divisions
For its entire existence, Fromager was divided into two departments: Gagnoa and Oumé.

Abolition
Fromager Region was abolished as part of the 2011 administrative reorganisation of the subdivisions of Ivory Coast. The area formerly encompassed by the region is now Gôh Region. Gôh is one of two regions in the first-level Gôh-Djiboua District.

References

Former regions of Ivory Coast
States and territories disestablished in 2011
2011 disestablishments in Ivory Coast
2000 establishments in Ivory Coast
States and territories established in 2000